Left Bloc may refer to:

 Left Bloc (Portugal), a political party in Portugal
 Left Bloc (Croatia), a political alliance in Croatia
 Left Bloc (Hungary), a political alliance in the Second Hungarian Republic
 Left Bloc (Luxembourg), a former political alliance in Luxembourg (1908–1912)
 Left Bloc (Palestine), a political organisation in Mandatory Palestine
 Left Bloc (Russia), a political alliance in Russia